The Statute Law (Repeals) Act 1981 (c 19) is an Act of the Parliament of the United Kingdom.

This Act was partly in force in Great Britain at the end of 2010.

Section 2

Orders under this section

The power conferred by section 2(3) was exercised by the Statute Law Repeals (Isle of Man) Order 1984 (SI 1984/1692).

Schedule 2
Paragraph 4 was repealed by section 1(1) of, and Group 4 of Part 1 of Schedule 1 to, the Statute Law (Repeals) Act 2008.

See also
Statute Law (Repeals) Act

References
Halsbury's Statutes. Fourth Edition. 2008 Reissue. Volume 41. Page 837.
Peter Allsop (Editor in chief). Current Law Statutes Annotated 1981. Sweet & Maxwell, Stevens & sons. London. W Green & son. Edinburgh. 1982. Volume 1.
The Public General Acts and General Synod Measures 1981. HMSO. London. 1982. Part I. Page 191.
HL Deb vol 416, col 1042, vol 417, cols 134 to 137, vol 418, col 375, vol 419, col 304, HC Deb vol 4, cols 239 to 245.

United Kingdom Acts of Parliament 1981